The Opalton grasswren (Amytornis rowleyi) is an insectivorous bird in the family Maluridae. It is found in the Forsyth Range, (Queensland, Australia). Formerly considered a sub-species of the Striated Grasswren (Amytornis striatus rowleyi), then known as the Rusty Grasswren. It is found around the opal mining area of Opalton and Lark Quarry south of Winton, Western Queensland. It was named as a full species by the I.O.C. in July 2020.

References

 

Opalton grasswren
Birds of Queensland
Endemic birds of Australia
Opalton grasswren